On the Air may refer to:

On the Air (album), 1984, by Billy Preston
On the Air (TV series), an American sitcom
On the Air (film), a 1934 British musical comedy
On the Air (band), an English rock band
 "On the Air", a song by Peter Gabriel from his second solo album

See also
 On the Aire, a current affairs programme in Leeds, England
 On air (disambiguation)